Godmania aesculifolia is a species of flowering plant in the family Bignoniaceae, native to the New World tropics. A tree, it contains 7,8-dihydroxyflavone, a flavonoid.

References

Bignoniaceae
Flora of Central Mexico
Flora of Veracruz
Flora of Southeastern Mexico
Flora of Southwestern Mexico
Flora of Central America
Flora of western South America
Flora of Venezuela
Flora of Guyana
Flora of North Brazil
Plants described in 1925